Agenda is a 2019 EP by English synth-pop duo Pet Shop Boys, digitally released on 8 February 2019 and released physically in April 2019 (on 12-inch vinyl). A CD edition of Agenda was only available to those who ordered the 2019 edition of Annually, the Pet Shop Boys' once-a-year publication.

Track listing
"Give Stupidity a Chance" – 2:59 
"On Social Media" – 3:33 
"What Are We Going to Do About the Rich?" – 3:03 
"The Forgotten Child" – 3:33

References

Pet Shop Boys albums
2019 EPs